The Jersey Honorary Police Long Service and Good Conduct Medal is a decoration for members of the  Honorary Police of the Bailiwick of Jersey. First instituted by Royal Warrant on 1 December 2014, it is an official award that can be worn alongside other British medals and decorations.

It is awarded for 12 years service, with a bar awarded for each subsequent period of 9 years. To qualify for the medal a member must have been:
 In service on or after 1 January 2012; and
 Have completed the required years of service (12 years for the medal; additional periods of 9 years for a bar) which may be continuous service or an aggregate and in more than one Parish or more than one office; and
 His or her character and conduct must have been very good.

Produced by the Royal Mint, the rhodium plated cupro-nickel circular medal has the following design: 
 The obverse has the Ian Rank-Broadley effigy of Queen Elizabeth II with the wording ELIZABETH II DEI GRATIA REGINA FID DEF.
 The reverse bears the coat of arms of Jersey superimposed on three crown-topped batons in front of an outline of the island, surrounded by the inscription HONORARY POLICE LONG SERVICE. JERSEY. 
 The medal has a plain, straight suspender. The ribbon is red with narrow white, blue and yellow stripes at each edge.
 The recipient's rank, name and years of service are inscribed on the rim.

The professional States of Jersey Police do not qualify, but are eligible for the Police Long Service and Good Conduct Medal.

References

Law enforcement in the United Kingdom
Civil awards and decorations of the United Kingdom
Law enforcement awards and honors
Awards established in 2014
2014 establishments in the United Kingdom
Government of Jersey
Jersey culture
Long and Meritorious Service Medals of Britain and the Commonwealth